The 2020–21 Süper Lig, officially called the Süper Lig 2020–21 season, was the 63rd season of the Süper Lig, the highest tier football league of Turkey.

Teams
A total of 21 teams contested the league, including eighteen sides from the 2019–20 season and three promoted from the 2019–20 TFF First League, including Hatayspor and BB Erzurumspor, as well as the winners of the 2019–20 TFF First League playoffs, Fatih Karagümrük. Hatayspor made its debut in the Süper Lig. BB Erzurumspor made an immediate return after one season away. Fatih Karagümrük returned following a 36 year hiatus after achieving two successive promotions. They were also relegated to amateur level twice during this period. 
The bottom four teams were relegated to the 2021–22 TFF First League.

Stadiums and locations

Personnel and sponsorship

Managerial changes

League table

Results

Number of teams by region

Statistics

Top goalscorers

Top assists

Clean sheets

Hat-tricks

4 Player scored four goals

Awards

Annual awards

References

External links
 

 

Turk
1
Süper Lig seasons